Hebron is an extinct town in Shelby County, in the U.S. state of Missouri. The GNIS classifies it as a populated place.

Hebron was founded in the 1840s, and named after the ancient city of Hebron, a place mentioned in the Hebrew Bible.

References

Ghost towns in Missouri
Former populated places in Shelby County, Missouri